Chalcophorella is a genus of beetles in the family Buprestidae, containing the following species:

 Chalcophorella bagdadensis (Laporte & Gory, 1836)
 Chalcophorella escalerae (Abeille de Perrin, 1904)
 Chalcophorella fabricii (Rossi, 1792)
 Chalcophorella morgani Thery, 1925
 Chalcophorella orientalis (Obenberger, 1924)
 Chalcophorella quadrioculata (Redtenbacher, 1843)
 Chalcophorella stigmatica (Schonherr, 1817)

References

Buprestidae genera